Li Fang (AD925–996), courtesy name Mingyuan, was a Chinese scholar and bureaucrat of the Song Dynasty, who served as an editor for three of the Four Great Books of Song. He was born in what is now Hengshui, Hebei, and once served the Later Han and Later Zhou.

References 

925 births
996 deaths
Chinese scholars
People from Hengshui
10th-century Chinese historians
Song dynasty historians